The following outline is provided as an overview of and topical guide to classical studies:

Classical studies (Classics for short) – earliest branch of the humanities, which covers the languages, literature, history, art, and other cultural aspects of the ancient Mediterranean world.  The field focuses primarily on, but is not limited to, Ancient Greece and Ancient Rome during classical antiquity, the era spanning from the late Bronze Age of Ancient Greece during the Minoan and Mycenaean periods (c. 1600–1100 BC) through the period known as Late Antiquity to the fall of the Western Roman Empire, c. 500 AD. The word classics is also used to refer to the literature of the period.

Branches of classical studies

 Culture of Ancient Greece
 Culture of Ancient Rome
 Culture of Ancient Mediterranean

Subdisciplines of classical studies

 Classical archaeology 
 Classical art 
 Art in ancient Greece 
Roman art
 Classical architecture 
 Architecture of Ancient Greece 
 Roman architecture
 Numismatics 
 Classical history 
Bronze Age
 Classical Antiquity
 Classical society 
Ancient Greek society 
 Roman society 
 Classical religion 
Religion in ancient Greece
Greek mythology
Religion in Ancient Rome
 Roman mythology
 Classical philology 
 Classical language
 Ancient Greek 
 Classical Latin
 Classical literature 
 Theatre of Ancient Greece 
 Theatre of Ancient Rome
 Classical Textual criticism 
 Classical philosophy 
 Greek philosophy
 Ancient philosophy
 Classical science and technology
 History of science in Classical Antiquity
 Ancient Greek technology
 Roman technology
 Palaeography

History of classical studies

History of the western classics (Not to be confused with classical history (see below))
 Literae Humaniores

General classical studies concepts

 Ancient history –
 Classical antiquity – 
 Literae Humaniores –

Classical archaeology

Classical archaeology
 Late Helladic period

Seven Wonders of the Ancient World

Seven Wonders of the Ancient World
The Greek category was not "Wonders" but "theamata", which translates closer to "must-sees". The list that we know today was compiled in the Middle Ages—by which time many of the sites were no longer in existence:

 Great Pyramid of Giza (the only wonder of the Ancient World still in existence)
 Hanging Gardens of Babylon
 Statue of Zeus at Olympia
 Temple of Artemis at Ephesus
 Mausoleum of Maussollos at Halicarnassus
 Colossus of Rhodes
 Lighthouse of Alexandria

Classical art
 See also Ancient art

Art in Ancient Greece

Art in Ancient Greece
 Music in ancient Greece
 Musical system of ancient Greece
 Sculpture in ancient Greece
 Theatre of ancient Greece

Roman art

Roman art
 Ancient Roman music
 Roman sculpture

Classical architecture

Classical architecture

Ancient Greek architecture

Architecture of Ancient Greece
 Parthenon
 Temple of Artemis
 Acropolis
 Ancient Agora
 Arch of Hadrian
 Statue of Zeus
 Colossus of Rhodes
 Temple of Hephaestus
 Samothrace temple complex

Roman architecture

Roman architecture
 Aedes (Roman)
 Roman aqueduct
 Basilica
 Roman Baths (Bath)
 Roman bridge
 Colosseum
 Forum (Roman)
 Ancient Roman monuments
 Roman road
 Roman temple
 Roman theatre (structure)
 Roman villa

Geography of the classical period

Geography at the time of Ancient Greece

 Aegean Sea
 Alexandria
 Athens
 Antioch 
 Corinth
 Delphi 
 Hellespont 
 Macedon 
 Miletus
 Olympia 
 Pergamon
 Sparta 
 Thermopylae 
 Troy

Geography at the time of Ancient Rome

 Area under Roman control –
 Borders of the Roman Empire –
 Roman Britain –
 Roman Campagna –
 Roman Gaul –
 Italia –
 Roman province –
 Roman Umbria –
 Via Flaminia –

Roman provinces 120 AD
 Achaea –
 Ægyptus –
 Africa –
 Alpes Cottiae –
 Alpes Maritimae –
 Alpes Poenninae –
 Arabia Petraea –
 Armenia Inferior –
 Asia –
 Assyria –
 Bithynia –
 Britannia –
 Cappadocia –
 Cilicia –
 Commagene –
 Corduene –
 Corsica et Sardinia –
 Creta et Cyrenaica –
 Cyprus –
 Dacia –
 Dalmatia –
 Epirus –
 Galatia –
 Gallia Aquitania –
 Gallia Belgica –
 Gallia Lugdunensis –
 Gallia Narbonensis –
 Germania Inferior –
 Germania Superior –
 Hispania Baetica –
 Hispania Lusitania –
 Hispania Tarraconensis –
 Italia –
 Iudaea –
 Iturea –
 Lycaonia –
 Lycia –
 Macedonia –
 Mauretania Caesariensis –
 Mauretania Tingitana –
 Moesia –
 Noricum –
 Numidia –
 Osroene –
 Pannonia –
 Pamphylia –
 Pisidia –
 Pontus –
 Raetia –
 Sicilia –
 Sophene –
 Syria –
 Taurica –
 Thracia –

Classical history

Classical history
 Timeline of classical antiquity
 Bronze Age –
 City-state –
 Classical Antiquity –
 Greco-Roman relations –
 Magic in the Greco-Roman world –

Classical Greek history

 Greek Dark Ages –
 Hellenistic period –
 Military history of ancient Greece –

Ancient Greek society

Ancient Greek society
 Cuisine of Ancient Greece –
 Economy of Ancient Greece –
 Law in Ancient Greece –
 Pederasty in ancient Greece –
 Prostitution in Ancient Greece –
 Slavery in Ancient Greece –

Classical Roman history

Roman era
 Timeline of Roman history
 Ancient Rome –
 Crisis of the Roman Republic –
 Decline of the Roman Empire –
 Etruscan civilization –
 Founding of Rome –
 History of Rome –
 Roman conquest of Britain –
 End of Roman rule in Britain –
 Roman Empire –
 Roman Kingdom –
 Roman Republic –
 Western Roman Empire –

Military history of Ancient Rome

Military history of ancient Rome
 Political history of the Roman military –
 Structural history of the Roman military –
 Technological history of the Roman military –
 War: Campaign history of the Roman military –
 Roman civil wars –
 Wars involving the Roman Empire –
 Wars involving the Roman Republic –

Roman society

Roman society
 Adoption in ancient Rome –
 Roman army –
 Roman assemblies –
 Auctoritas –
 Buddhism and the Roman world –
 Roman citizenship –
 Collegiality –
 Roman commerce –
 Roman consul –
 Republican consuls –
 Early imperial consuls –
 Late imperial consuls –
 Roman currency –
 Cursus honorum –
 Roman Emperor –
 List of Roman Emperors –
 Roman festivals –
 Roman funerals and burial –
 Roman finance –
 Roman gardens –
 Homosexuality in ancient Rome –
 Imperium –
 Roman law –
 Roman laws –
 Status in Roman legal system –
 Local government (ancient Roman) –
 Roman Magistrates –
 Ancient Roman marriage –
 Roman naming conventions –
 Roman navy –
 Political institutions of Rome –
 Roman province –
 Roman relations with the Parthians and Sassanians –
 Roman school –
 Roman Senate –
 Roman tribe –
 Sino-Roman relations –
 Slavery in ancient Rome –
 Social class in ancient Rome –
 Roman usurper –

Classical Egyptian history

 Third Intermediate Period of Egypt (21st to 25th Dynasties; 11th to 7th centuries BC)
 Late Period of ancient Egypt (26th to 31st Dynasties; 7th century BC to 332 BC)
 History of Persian Egypt (525 BC to 332 BC) - see also Achaemenid Empire
 Greco-Roman Egypt (332 BC to 642 AD)
 Hellenistic Egypt (332 BC to 30 BC)
 Macedonian Kings (332 BC to 305 BC)
 Ptolemaic Kingdom (305 BC to 30 BC)
 Egypt (Roman province) (30 BC to 642 AD)

See also the List of ancient Egyptian dynasties

Classical philology

Philology –

Classical language

Classical language –

Ancient Greek

Ancient Greek –
 Aeolic dialect –
 Attic dialect –
 Doric dialect –
 Greek alphabet –
 Homeric Greek –
 Ionic dialect –
 Koine –

Classical Latin

Classical Latin
 Latin alphabet –
 Roman cursive –

Classical literature

Classical Greek literature

Ancient Greek literature –

Poets
 Bucolic poets
 Theocritus –
 Didactic poets
 Hesiod –
 Epic poets
 Homer –
 Lyric poets
 Alcaeus –
  Alcman –
 Archilochus –
 Bacchylides –
 Mimnermus –
 Pindar –
 Sappho –
 Semonides –
 Simonides of Ceos –
 Tyrtaeus –

Playwrights 
Tragedians
 Aeschylus –
 Euripides –
 Sophocles –
 Comedic playwrights
 Aristophanes –
 Menander –

Prose writers
 Fiction: Xenophon –
 Historiography: Herodotus, Plutarch, Polybius, Thucydides, Xenophon –
 Oratory: Aeschines, Demosthenes, Isocrates, Lysias –
 Other: Lucian, Plato –

Classical Latin literature

Latin literature –

Poets
 Didactic poets
 Lucretius –
 Ovid –
 Virgil –
 Elegiac poets
 Catullus –
 Ovid –
 Propertius –
 Tibullus –
 Epic poets
 Ennius –
 Lucan –
 Ovid –
 Virgil –
 Lyric poets
 Catullus –
 Horace –

Playwrights
 Plautus –
 Terence –

Prose writers
 Epistolary writers
 Pliny the younger –
 Seneca –
 Fiction writers
 Apuleius –
 Petronius –
 Historiographers
Caesar –
 Cornelius Nepos –
 Livy –
 Sallust –
 Suetonius –
 Tacitus –
Orators:
 Cicero –

Classical Textual Criticism

Textual criticism
 Greek textual criticism
 Latin textual criticism

Classical philosophy

Periods of classical philosophy

 Pre-Socratic philosophy –
 Classical Greek philosophy –
 Hellenistic philosophy –

Schools of thought

 Aristotelianism – Aristotle
 Cynicism –
 Cyrenaic hedonism –
 Eclecticism –
 Epicureanism –
 Neo-Platonism – Plato
 Neo-Pythagoreanism –
 Platonism – 
 Pre-Socratic naturalism –
 Pyrrhonism –
 Pythagoreanism – Pythagoras
 Sophism –
 Stoicism –

Classical philosophers

 Aenesidemus –
 Agrippa –
 Alexander of Aphrodisias –
 Ammonius Saccas –
 Anaxagoras –
 Anaximander –
 Anaximenes –
 Antisthenes –
 Antiochus of Ascalon –
 Arcesilaus –
 Aristippus –
 Aristotle –
 Carneades –
 Chrysippus –
 Cleanthes –
 Clitomachus –
 Crates of Thebes –
 Cratylus –
 Democritus –
 Diogenes of Apollonia –
 Diogenes of Sinope –
 Empedocles –
 Epictetus –
 Epicurus –
 Euclid of Megara –
 Heraclitus –
 Hippias –
 Iamblichus –
 Leucippus –
 Melissus –
 Panaetius –
 Parmenides –
 Philo of Larissa –
 Philolaus –
 Plato –
 Plotinus –
 Posidonius –
 Porphyry –
 Prodicus –
 Protagoras –
 Pyrrho –
 Pythagoras –
 Seneca –
 Sextus Empiricus –
 Socrates –
 Speusippus –
 Stilpo –
 Thales –
 Theophrastus –
 Timon –
 Xenophanes –
 Xenocrates –
 Zeno of Citium –
 Zeno of Elea –

Classical religion and mythology
 Interpretatio graeca
 Classical mythology
 Mystery religions
 Hellenistic religion

Religion and mythology in Ancient Greece

 Achilles –
 Apollo –
 Centaurs
 Dionysus –
 Dragons in Greek mythology –
 Earth-gods –
 Eleusinian Mysteries –
 Golden Fleece –
 Gorgon / Medusa –
 Hellenic polytheism –
 Heracles –
 The Twelve Labours of Heracles –
 Jason –
 Minotaur –
 Nymphs
 Odysseus –
 Odyssey –
 Oedipus –
 Pan –
 Perseus –
 Olympians –
 Primordial gods –
 Satyrs
 Sea-gods –
 Seven against Thebes –
 Theseus –
 Titans –
 Triptolemus –
 Trojan War –
 Zeus –

Religion and mythology in Ancient Rome

 Pontifex Maximus –
 Roman Pontiff –

Classical science and technology

History of science in Classical Antiquity

Ancient Greek science and technology

Ancient Greek technology
 Agriculture of Ancient Greece –
 Archimedes –
 Ancient Greek astronomy –
 Geographical technology –
 Ptolemy –
 Greek mathematics –
 Euclid –
 Medicine in ancient Greece –
 Hippocrates –
 Galen –
 Pottery of Ancient Greece –

Roman science and technology

Roman technology
 Roman abacus –
 Roman agriculture –
 Roman calendar –
 Cement / concrete –
 Corvus (ship's weapon) –
 Ancient Roman cranes –
 Roman engineering –
 Glassblowing –
 Medical community of ancient Rome –
 Military of ancient Rome –
 Roman numerals –
 Plumbing –
 Roman road –
 Ancient Roman units of measurement –
 Sanitation in ancient Rome –

Classical theatre

 Amphitheatre –

Ancient Greek theatre

Theatre of Ancient Greece

Ancient Roman theatre

Theatre of Ancient Rome
 Circus Maximus –
 Roman amphitheatres –

Classical studies scholars

See List of classical scholars –

Classics-related lists

 List of classical architecture terms
 List of classical meters

Ancient Greek lists

 List of ancient Greek cities
 List of ancient Greeks
 List of ancient Greek tyrants
 List of Greek mythological creatures
 List of Greek mythological figures
 List of ancient Macedonians

Roman lists

 List of Latin abbreviations
 List of aqueducts in the Roman Empire
 List of Roman aqueducts by date
 List of Roman amphitheatres
 List of Roman cognomina
 Lists of Roman consuls
 List of Republican Roman Consuls
 List of early imperial Roman consuls
 List of late imperial Roman consuls
 List of Roman deities / List of Roman gods
 List of Roman Goddesses
 List of Roman Emperors
 List of Roman emperors to be condemned
 List of films based on Greco-Roman mythology
 List of Roman gladiator types
 List of Roman laws
 List of Roman legions
 List of Roman nomina
 Lists of Roman places
 List of Roman place names in Britain
 List of Roman places in Hispania
 List of Romans
 List of Roman sites
 List of Roman triumphal arches in Italy outside Rome
 List of Roman usurpers
 List of Imperial Roman victory titles
 List of Roman villas in England

See also

External links

Classical studies
Classical studies